Let's Go! is a 2001 EP by The Apples in Stereo. It contains five songs.

The artwork for the cover of the EP was done by Craig McCracken, creator of The Powerpuff Girls.

Track listing
All tracks are written by Robert Schneider except for track 3, written by Brian Wilson and Van Dyke Parks.

 "Signal in the Sky (Let's Go)"  – 2:58 - This song is from the album Heroes & Villains, a soundtrack to the animated television series The Powerpuff Girls. It is featured in a Season 4 episode of the series, "Superfriends".
 "If You Want to Wear a Hat"  – 2:11 - This is the only original song to be found on the album, as the other four songs are originally found on other albums or are demo versions, etc.
 "Heroes & Villains"  – 3:44 - This track is a cover song of "Heroes and Villains" by The Beach Boys. The song was recorded live at Schubas Tavern in Chicago, Illinois on March 26, 2000.
 "Stream Running Over"  – 2:25 - This track is an acoustic version of the song of the same name originally found on the Apples in Stereo album The Discovery of a World Inside the Moone. It is recorded with only vocals and acoustic guitar.
 "Signal in the Sky (Let's Go)"  – 3:08 - This track is the original demo version of the first track.

Personnel 
 Robert Schneider - guitar, lead vocals
 Eric Allen - bass
 John Hill - guitar
 Chris McDuffie - keyboards
 Hilarie Sidney - drums

References

The Apples in Stereo albums
2001 EPs
SpinART Records EPs
The Elephant 6 Recording Company EPs